Neil Jason, is an American musician, songwriter, producer and composer. In a career spanning more than 40 years, he has worked with some of the biggest recording artists, including John Lennon, Billy Joel, Roxy Music, Mick Jagger, Pete Townshend, Paul McCartney, Paul Simon, Kiss, Gene Simmons, Michael Jackson, Brecker Brothers, Hall & Oates, Cyndi Lauper, Harry Chapin, Joe Jackson, Charlie Watts, Dire Straits, Bryan Ferry, Diana Ross, John McLaughlin, Gladys Knight, Debbie Harry, Michael Franks, Bob James, David Sanborn, Brigitte Zarie, Carly Simon, Janis Ian, Nils Lofgren, Eddie Van Halen and tenor Luciano Pavarotti. He also writes for TV and film.

Neil was a member of the Saturday Night Live house band from 1980 to 1983 and has made over a hundred appearances with Paul Shaffer’s band on The Late Show With David Letterman. He has also worked on countless hit commercials and movies as a composer in New York City.

Early life
Neil Jason was born and raised in New York City. He grew up in Brooklyn and began playing the trumpet in the sixth grade. He went on to play in all the school bands, not only the trumpet, but also saxophone and trombone. He started taking piano lessons to learn more about music. He did not play the bass guitar until he was in high school.

Influence
Neil Jason has identified his influences as a combination of his school training on trumpet, saxophone, and piano (giving his fingers strength and dexterity). Bands who influenced him included Chase, Dreams and Chicago, and the musicians who influenced him included James Jamerson, Bob Babbitt, Larry Graham and Sly Stone.

Collaborations

Artists
Harry Chapin
Eumir Deodato
Bryan Ferry at Wiener Stadthalle, Vienna (May 30, 2017)
Michael Franks
Debbie Harry
Janis Ian
Joe Jackson
Michael Jackson
Mick Jagger
Bob James
Billy Joel
Eric Johnson at Iridium Jazz Club, NYC (June 2010)
Gladys Knight
Cyndi Lauper
John Lennon
Nils Lofgren
Paul McCartney
John McLaughlin
Ted Nugent at Iridium Jazz Club, NYC (May 16, 2011)
Luciano Pavarotti
Diana Ross
David Sanborn
Paul Shaffer
Carly Simon
Paul Simon
Gene Simmons
Pete Townshend
Eddie Van Halen
Charlie Watts

Bands
Brecker Brothers at Cotton Club, Tokyo
CBS Orchestra previously known as "The World's Most Dangerous Band" (NBC)
Dire Straits
Hall & Oates
Kiss
Roxy Music
Saturday Night Live Band

Personal life
In 1998, he married Canadian-born American singer, songwriter and composer Brigitte Zarie.

Interviews

Interviewed in Denmark, Summer 2014 during Brecker Brothers Reunion tour.
Interviewed at JazzAaar Festival, Aarau, Switzerland, May 1, 2016

References

https://forbassplayersonly.com/neil-jason/

External links
 
 
 

American rock bass guitarists
American session musicians
Living people
American rock musicians
Cor anglais players
American jazz bass guitarists
American male bass guitarists
Guitarists from New York City
Jazz musicians from New York (state)
American male jazz musicians
Year of birth missing (living people)